Dracaena sanderiana is a species of flowering plant in the family Asparagaceae, native to Central Africa. It was named after the German–English gardener Henry Frederick Conrad Sander (1847–1920). The plant is commonly marketed as "lucky bamboo".

Names
Common names include Sander's dracaena, ribbon dracaena, lucky bamboo, curly bamboo, Chinese water bamboo, Goddess of Mercy's plant, Belgian evergreen. It is also called ribbon plant, although the same common name is sometimes used for Chlorophytum comosum (also known as the spider plant). While the word bamboo occurs in several of this plant's common names, D. sanderiana is of an entirely different taxonomic order from true bamboos – though it is worth noting that this plant and true bamboos both fall under the monocot clade. Despite several of its common names that suggest it is from China or Belgium, it is a native African species. Dracaena sanderiana is often confused with Dracaena braunii, a plant from coastal West Africa with flowers 5 times shorter than those of D. sanderiana.

Description
The stem is fleshy, which distinguishes it from bamboo. It requires bright, ventilated areas. It tolerates dry air and does not require constant spraying. A very tenacious plant, it is rather difficult to destroy it.

Cultivation
Dracaena sanderiana and its related varieties are popular houseplants. It is a suitable plant in a confined space, and the most suitable place is a scattered light or semi-shade site because direct sunlight causes yellowing and burning of leaves. It requires average warmth, good illumination, regular watering with dry periods in between. If planted in the ground, it loses its bamboo-like look and it would fill with a leaf-like shape like other dragon trees.

It is multiplied by cutting a part of the stem just above the eye. Cuttings can be made year round.

Gallery

See also

References

sanderiana
Flora of Cameroon
House plants
Low light plants